Brew may refer to:

People
 Brew (surname)

Computing
 Binary Runtime Environment for Wireless (Brew or BREW), a development platform for mobile phones created by Qualcomm
 brew command used by the package management software Homebrew

Organizations
 Brew House Association, an artistic collective on the south side of Pittsburgh
 Business Resource Efficiency and Waste programme, part of the UK government's Department for Environment, Food and Rural Affairs

Slang terms
 A slang term for coffee
 A slang term for beer
 Northern English slang for a cup of tea
 "Brew up", a term of British origin for the loss of a tank by a catastrophic kill

Other
 Brew (horse), a Melbourne Cup winner in 2000
 Drip brew, a method for brewing coffee
 The Brew (band), a British rock band
 The Brew (brand), the brand name of a Classic Rock music format

See also 
 Brewing (disambiguation)
 Broo (disambiguation)
 Homebrew (disambiguation)
 Iron Brew (disambiguation)
 Mount Brew (disambiguation), several mountains in British Columbia, Canada
 The Brew (disambiguation)
 True Brew (disambiguation)
 Witches Brew (disambiguation)